Cover to Cover is an American television program broadcast on the business channel CNBC in 2005. It deals especially with criminology and trial cases. The anchor is Liz Claman. The program is produced by NBC News Productions and the Dateline NBC reporters.

Episode subjects
Brown's Chicken Massacre
Robert Pickton
Elián González
Anna Slabaugh
Birdie Joe Hoaks
Robin Gilbert
Chain of Command: The Road from 9/11 to Abu Ghraib (Seymour Hersh)

CNBC original programming